Oliver Frost Cutts (August 6, 1873 – August 4, 1939) was an American football player, coach, and college athletics administrator.  He served as the head football coach at Purdue University (1903–1904), the University of Washington (1905), and Bates College (1922–1923), compiling a career college football record of 23–18–3.  Cutts was also the athletic director at Purdue from 1904 to 1905 and again from 1915 to 1918.  He died on  August 4, 1939 at his home in the Jamaica Plain neighborhood of Boston, Massachusetts.

Coaching career
From 1903 to 1904, Cutts coached at Purdue University, where he compiled a 13–5 record. This included a 9–3 season in 1904, where the Boilermakers outscored opponents 176–66. In 1905, he coached at the University of Washington, where he compiled a 4–2–2 record.

Head coaching record

References

External links

1873 births
1939 deaths
American football guards
American football tackles
Bates Bobcats baseball players
Bates Bobcats football coaches
Bates Bobcats football players
Harvard Crimson football coaches
Harvard Crimson football players
Purdue Boilermakers athletic directors
Purdue Boilermakers football coaches
Washington Huskies football coaches
College men's track and field athletes in the United States
All-American college football players
Bates College faculty
Harvard Law School alumni
People from Anson, Maine
People from Jamaica Plain
Coaches of American football from Maine
Players of American football from Maine